Sanaa intermedia is a species of bush-crickets, found in Indo-China. It belongs to the tribe Cymatomerini and the subfamily Pseudophyllinae, with no subspecies listed in the Catalogue of Life.

Gallery

References

External links
 

Pseudophyllinae
intermedia
Invertebrates of Southeast Asia
Insects described in 1944